Asplenium trichomanoides is an invalid species name, which may refer to:

Asplenium trichomanes, described in 1767 as Asplenium trichomanoides L.
Asplenium platyneuron, described in 1803 as Asplenium trichomanoides Michx.
Asplenium resiliens, described in 1848 as Asplenium trichomanoides Kunze

trichomanoides